The HSA Foundation is a not-for-profit engineering organization of industry and academia that works on the development of the Heterogeneous System Architecture (HSA), a set of royalty-free computer hardware specifications, as well as open source software development tools needed to use HSA features in application software.

The HSA Foundation aims to develop and define features and interfaces for various types of computer processors, including CPUs, graphics processors, DSPs; as well as the memory systems that connect these. The resulting architecture, HSA, aims to make it easier to program parallel systems built from heterogeneous combinations of these devices.

The HSA Foundation was founded by AMD, ARM Holdings, Imagination Technologies, MediaTek, Qualcomm, Samsung and Texas Instruments. Further members include licensors and licensees of semiconductor intellectual property, developers of CPUs, GPUs, DSPs and application-specific integrated circuits (ASICs) based upon own and/or licensed technology, academic partners such as the Lawrence Livermore National Laboratory and the University of Bologna, and the not-for-profit engineering organization Linaro. The HSA Foundation has itself joined the Linux Foundation.

HSA Foundation engineering works with upstream projects on a set of requirements that are determined by the Technical Steering Committee.

Members 

Founding
 Advanced Micro Devices
 Arm Ltd.
 Imagination Technologies
 MediaTek
 Samsung Electronics
 Texas Instruments
Later 
 Analog Devices
 Argonne National Laboratory
 Arteris
 University of Bristol
 Broadcom Corporation
 Canonical (company)
 Ceva (semiconductor company)
 Codeplay
 University of Illinois Department of Computer Science
 School of Informatics, University of Edinburgh
 Huawei
 Industrial Technology Research Institute
 Lawrence Livermore National Laboratory
 LG Electronics
 Linaro
 N.M.A.M. Institute of Technology
 National Tsing Hua University
 Northeastern University
 Oak Ridge National Laboratory
 Oracle Corporation
 S3 Graphics
 STMicroelectronics
 Synopsys
 University of Tampere
 Tensilica
 Tsinghua University
 University of Bologna
 VIA Technologies
 Vivante Corporation

References

 
Business organizations based in the United States
Free and open-source software organizations
Free software projects
Heterogeneous System Architecture
Software engineering organizations